Jhunjhunu Lok Sabha constituency is one of the 25 Lok Sabha (parliamentary)  constituencies in Rajasthan state in western India. The current MP is Narendra Kumar of Bharatiya Janata Party

Assembly segments
Presently, Jhunjhunu Lok Sabha constituency comprises Eight Vidhan Sabha (legislative assembly) segments. These are:

Members of Parliament

Election results

2019 Lok Sabha

2014 Lok Sabha

2009 Lok Sabha

1998

Notes

External links
Jhunjhunu lok sabha constituency election 2019 result details

See also
 Jhunjhunu district
 List of Constituencies of the Lok Sabha

Jhunjhunu district
Lok Sabha constituencies in Rajasthan